James Monroe Taylor (August 5, 1848 – December 19, 1916) was a Baptist minister who was the fourth president of Vassar College.

Education and career
Born in Brooklyn, New York on August 5, 1848, he was educated at the University of Rochester, from which he graduated in 1868. He went on to study at Rochester Theological Seminary, becoming ordained as a Baptist minister in 1871. He toured Europe in 1873, and then spent 16 years working as a minister around Rhode Island and Connecticut.

Taylor became the president of Vassar College in 1886, and remained in the position until 1914.

Personal life
Taylor married Kate Huntington in the 1870s. The couple had four children. Taylor died of pneumonia in New York City on December 19, 1916, only two years after retiring from Vassar.

References

Haight, Elizabeth Hazleton (1919). Life and Letters of James Monroe Taylor. New York: E.P. Dutton & Company.
Matsumoto, Lila (2005). "James Monroe Taylor". Vassar Encyclopedia. Accessed January 19, 2020.
S. B. E (1920). "James Monroe Taylor". The Sewanee Review 28 (3): 467–72. 

1848 births
1916 deaths
People from Brooklyn
University of Rochester alumni
Colgate Rochester Crozer Divinity School alumni
Baptist ministers from the United States
Presidents of Vassar College
Deaths from pneumonia in New York City